George O'Neill (born 26 July 1942) is a former professional soccer player who played as a left half. He began his career in Scotland, playing with eight clubs over nine seasons before moving to the Philadelphia Atoms of the North American Soccer League. He retired from playing professionally in 1976. In 1973, he earned two caps with the U.S. national team.

Club career

Scotland
O'Neill was born in Port Glasgow, Scotland. He signed for Scottish club Celtic in November 1962, but never entered the first team. After two seasons, he moved to Barrow of the English Football League Division Four for the 1964–65 season. He played seven games with Barrow before transferring back north to Ayr United. He finished out the 1964–65 season with Ayr, playing only four games. He then moved to Scottish Amateur Football League club Dunoon Athletic for the 1965–66 season. Whether this was a loan from Ayr or a transfer remains unknown. In 1966, he joined Partick Thistle where he finally found significant playing time. Over his four seasons with the club, he played 72 games and scored five goals. He then moved to Morton for a little more than a season before transferring on 16 March 1971 to Dunfermline Athletic. He saw time in twenty-five games before moving to St Mirren in 1972. He played only two games with St Mirren before leaving Scotland for the United States.

NASL
In 1973, O'Neill signed with the expansion Philadelphia Atoms of the North American Soccer League. That year, the Atoms won the NASL championship. He remained with the team until it folded following the 1976 season.

International career
In 1973, O'Neill earned two caps with the U.S. national team. The first came in a 1–0 loss to Haiti on 3 November 1973. The second was another 1–0 loss to Haiti two days later.

Coaching career
In 1978, O'Neill was hired to coach the Philadelphia Fever of the Major Indoor Soccer League until he was fired in 1980. He then replaced Derek Travis as the assistant coach of the Philadelphia Fury of the NASL. He spent several years as a coach with the Philadelphia Inter Soccer Club before becoming the interim head coach of the University of Pennsylvania men's soccer team on 18 August 1993 after Steve Baumann resigned. He led the team to a 5–10 record before being named to the head coach position. He was then hired as the team's head coach in January 1994. O'Neill was fired following the 1997 season after he amassed a 28–47–4 record over his five seasons as head coach.

See also
List of United States men's international soccer players born outside the United States

References

External links

NASL stats

Living people
1942 births
American soccer coaches
American soccer players
Ayr United F.C. players
Barrow A.F.C. players
Celtic F.C. players
Dunfermline Athletic F.C. players
Scottish Football League players
English Football League players
Greenock Morton F.C. players
Major Indoor Soccer League (1978–1992) coaches
North American Soccer League (1968–1984) coaches
North American Soccer League (1968–1984) players
Partick Thistle F.C. players
Penn Quakers men's soccer coaches
Philadelphia Atoms players
Scottish footballers
St Mirren F.C. players
United States men's international soccer players
Scottish emigrants to the United States
Association football wing halves
Scottish expatriate sportspeople in the United States
Expatriate soccer players in the United States
Scottish expatriate footballers